Laft (also Romanized as Lāft; also known as Bandar-e Lāft, Lāft-e Now, and Yāft) is a village in Howmeh Rural District, in the Central District of Qeshm County, Hormozgan Province, Iran. At the 2006 census, its population was 3,899, in 765 families. Laft is more than 2000 years old. It is located on Qeshm island in the Straits of Hormuz, to the south-west of Bandar Abbas.

Description
Laft is surrounded by Hara forests (mangroves). The most obvious architectural features of the houses is their variously-sized windbreaks (windtowers). The people of Laft constructed them for making the inner space of the building cool in summer. The buildings of Laft are constructed close to each other, with winding and narrow alleys.

Historical monuments in Laft include Naderi Castle, a square-shaped castle with four towers; two rounded dome-like reservoirs; a burial ground in which some of the inscriptions are dated to 1000 years ago; and the shrines of Seyed Hassan
Mansor, Sheikh Tousi, and Sheikh AndarAbi. Behind the castle, in a crater, 366 Tala (Golden) wells were dug for gathering the rainwater, one for each day of the leap year in Iran. Some historians believe that these wells date from the time of the Achaemenian and Sassanian dynasties.

At Laft harbor, there is a dock which is related to Median, Achaemenian, and Sassanian dynasties. This dock is about 130 m long and the main seabed thick of about 7 m. The walls at the dock are about 3 m that are made up bevelled stones.

Near Laft a 220 kV-powerline crosses Ghesm strait.

Sheikh AndarAbi Island
Across from Laft and Khamir harbors, there is a very small island which is named Sheikh AndarAbi. Some parts of this small island are covered with water at high tide. The distance between Laft harbor and Sheikh AndarAbi Island can be covered by a speedboat in less than 5 minutes. At the north margin of Sheikh AndarAbi Island, the surface of the land is lower than other parts of the island and there are many Hara trees. At the southeast margin of the island there is a famous dome which is popular as the Shrine of Sheikh AndarAbi or Qadamgah-e Sheikh (footprint of the Sheikh). At high tide seawater covers the majority of the Island. Nowadays, nobody lives there, and fishermen and sailors are still respecting this island.

References

1.	الكوخردى ، محمد ، بن يوسف، (كُوخِرد حَاضِرَة اِسلامِيةَ عَلي ضِفافِ نَهر مِهران) الطبعة الثالثة ،دبى: سنة 199۷ للميلاد Mohammed Kookherdi (1997) Kookherd, an Islamic civil at Mehran river,  third edition: Dubai
2. کامله،القاسمی،  بنت شیخ عبدالله، (تاریخ لنجة)  مکتبة دبي للتوزیع، الامارات: الطبعة الثانية عام ۱۹۹۳ للمیلاد
3 . الوحیدی الخنجی، حسین بن علی بن احمد،  «تاریخ لنجه» ، الطبعة الثانية دبی: دار الأمة للنشر والتوزیع، ۱۹۸۸ للمیلاد
 اطلس گیتاشناسی استان‌های ایران [Atlas Gitashenasi Ostanhai Iran] (Gitashenasi Province Atlas of Iran)

Populated places in Qeshm County
Port cities and towns of the Persian Gulf
Port cities and towns of the Arabian Sea
Port cities and towns in Iran